Typhus, also known as typhus fever, is a group of infectious diseases that include epidemic typhus, scrub typhus, and murine typhus. Common symptoms include fever, headache, and a rash. Typically these begin one to two weeks after exposure.

The diseases are caused by specific types of bacterial infection. Epidemic typhus is due to Rickettsia prowazekii spread by body lice, scrub typhus is due to Orientia tsutsugamushi spread by chiggers, and murine typhus is due to Rickettsia typhi spread by fleas.

Vaccines have been developed, but none are commercially available. Prevention is achieved by reducing exposure to the organisms that spread the disease. Treatment is with the antibiotic doxycycline. Epidemic typhus generally occurs in outbreaks when poor sanitary conditions and crowding are present. While once common, it is now rare. Scrub typhus occurs in Southeast Asia, Japan, and northern Australia. Murine typhus occurs in tropical and subtropical areas of the world.

Typhus has been described since at least 1528. The name comes from the Greek tûphos, meaning hazy or smoky and commonly used as a word for delusion, describing the state of mind of those infected. While "typhoid" means "typhus-like", typhus and typhoid fever are distinct diseases caused by different types of bacteria. Note, however, that in some languages such as German, typhus does mean "typhoid fever".

Signs and symptoms

These signs and symptoms refer to epidemic typhus, as it is the most important of the typhus group of diseases.

Signs and symptoms begin with sudden onset of fever and other flu-like symptoms about one to two weeks after being infected. Five to nine days after the symptoms have started, a rash typically begins on the trunk and spreads to the extremities. This rash eventually spreads over most of the body, sparing the face, palms, and soles. Signs of meningoencephalitis begin with the rash and continue into the second or third weeks. Other signs of meningoencephalitis include sensitivity to light (photophobia), altered mental status (delirium), or coma. Untreated cases are often fatal.

Causes
Multiple diseases include the word "typhus" in their descriptions. Types include:

Prevention
As of 2020, no vaccine is commercially available. A vaccine has been in development for scrub typhus known as the scrub typhus vaccine.

Treatment
The American Public Health Association recommends treatment based upon clinical findings and before culturing confirms the diagnosis. Without treatment, death may occur in 10% to 60% of people with epidemic typhus, with people over age 60 having the highest risk of death.  In the antibiotic era, death is uncommon if doxycycline is given. In one study of 60 people hospitalized with epidemic typhus, no one died when given doxycycline or chloramphenicol.

Epidemiology
According to the World Health Organization, the current death rate from typhus is about one  of every 5,000,000 people per year.

Only a few areas of epidemic typhus exist today.  Since the late 20th century, cases have been reported in Burundi, Rwanda, Ethiopia, Algeria, and a few areas in South and Central America.

Except for two cases, all instances of epidemic typhus in the United States have occurred east of the Mississippi River. An examination of a cluster of cases in Pennsylvania concluded the source of the infection was flying squirrels. Sylvatic cycle (diseases transmitted from wild animals) epidemic typhus remains uncommon in the US.  The Centers for Disease Control and Prevention have documented only 47 cases from 1976 to 2010. An outbreak of flea-borne murine typhus was identified in downtown Los Angeles, California, in October 2018.

History

Middle Ages
The first reliable description of typhus appears in 1489 AD during the Spanish siege of Baza against the Moors during the War of Granada (1482–1492). These accounts include descriptions of fever; red spots over arms, back, and chest; attention deficit, progressing to delirium; and gangrenous sores and the associated smell of rotting flesh. During the siege, the Spaniards lost 3,000 men to enemy action, but an additional 17,000 died of typhus.

In historical times, "jail fever" or "gaol fever" was common in English prisons, and is believed by modern authorities to have been typhus. It often occurred when prisoners were crowded together into dark, filthy rooms where lice spread easily. Thus, "imprisonment until the next term of court" was often equivalent to a death sentence. Prisoners brought before the court sometimes infected members of the court. The Black Assize of Exeter 1586 was another notable outbreak. During the Lent assizes court held at Taunton in 1730, gaol fever caused the death of the Lord Chief Baron, as well as the High Sheriff, the sergeant, and hundreds of others. During a time when persons were executed for capital offenses, more prisoners died from 'gaol fever' than were put to death by all the public executioners in the British realm. In 1759, an English authority estimated that each year, a quarter of the prisoners had died from gaol fever. In London, gaol fever frequently broke out among the ill-kept prisoners of Newgate Prison and then moved into the general city population. In May 1750, the Lord Mayor of London, Sir Samuel Pennant, and many court personnel were fatally infected in the courtroom of the Old Bailey, which adjoined Newgate Prison.

Early modern epidemics
Epidemics occurred routinely throughout Europe from the 16th to the 19th centuries, including during the English Civil War, the Thirty Years' War, and the Napoleonic Wars. Pestilence of several kinds raged among combatants and civilians in Germany and surrounding lands from 1618 to 1648. According to Joseph Patrick Byrne, "By war's end, typhus may have killed more than 10 percent of the total German population, and disease in general accounted for 90 percent of Europe's casualties."

19th century
During Napoleon's retreat from Moscow in 1812, more French soldiers died of typhus than were killed by the Russians.

A major epidemic occurred in Ireland between 1816 and 1819, during the famine caused by a worldwide reduction in temperature known as the Year Without a Summer. An estimated 100,000 people perished. Typhus appeared again in the late 1830s, and yet another major typhus epidemic occurred during the Great Irish Famine between 1846 and 1849. The Irish typhus spread to England, where it was sometimes called "Irish fever" and was noted for its virulence. It killed people of all social classes, as lice were endemic and inescapable, but it hit particularly hard in the lower or "unwashed" social strata.

In the United States, a typhus epidemic broke out in Philadelphia in 1837 and killed the son of Franklin Pierce (14th President of the United States) in Concord, New Hampshire, in 1843. Several epidemics occurred in Baltimore, Memphis, and Washington, DC, between 1865 and 1873. Typhus was also a significant killer during the US Civil War, although typhoid fever was the more prevalent cause of US Civil War "camp fever". Typhoid fever is caused by the bacterium Salmonella enterica Serovar Typhi.

In Canada alone, the typhus epidemic of 1847 killed more than 20,000 people from 1847 to 1848, mainly Irish immigrants in fever sheds and other forms of quarantine, who had contracted the disease aboard the crowded coffin ships in fleeing the Great Irish Famine. Officials neither knew how to provide sufficient sanitation under conditions of the time nor understood how the disease spread.

20th century
Typhus was endemic in Poland and several neighboring countries prior to World War I (1914–1918), but became epidemic during the war. Delousing stations were established for troops on the Western Front during World War I, but typhus ravaged the armies of the Eastern Front, where over 150,000 died in Serbia alone. Fatalities were generally between 10% and 40% of those infected and the disease was a major cause of death for those nursing the sick.

In 1922, the typhus epidemic reached its peak in Soviet territory, with some 20 to 30 million cases in Russia. Although typhus had ravaged Poland with some 4 million cases reported, efforts to stem the spread of disease in that country had largely succeeded by 1921 through the efforts of public health pioneers such as Hélène Sparrow and Rudolf Weigl. In Russia during the civil war between the White and Red Armies, epidemic typhus killed 2–3 million people, many of whom were civilians. In 1937 and 1938 there was a typhus epidemic in Chile.

During World War II, many German POWs after the loss at Stalingrad died of typhus. Typhus epidemics killed those confined to POW camps, ghettos, and Nazi concentration camps who were held in unhygienic conditions. Pictures of mass graves including people who died from typhus can be seen in footage shot at Bergen-Belsen concentration camp. Among thousands of prisoners in concentration camps such as Theresienstadt and Bergen-Belsen who died of typhus were Anne Frank, age 15, and her sister Margot, age 19 in the latter camp.

The first typhus vaccine was developed by the Polish zoologist Rudolf Weigl in the interwar period; the vaccine did not prevent the disease but reduced its mortality.

21st century
Beginning in 2018, a typhus outbreak spread through Los Angeles County primarily affecting homeless people. In 2019, city attorney Elizabeth Greenwood revealed that she, too, was infected with typhus as a result of a flea bite at her office in Los Angeles City Hall.  Pasadena also experienced a sudden uptick in typhus with 22 cases in 2018 but, without being able to attribute this to one location, the Pasadena Public Health Department did not identify the cases as an "outbreak".

References 

 
Rickettsioses
Wikipedia infectious disease articles ready to translate
Wikipedia medicine articles ready to translate